Brynderwyn is a settlement in Northland, New Zealand. It is located at the junction of SH1 and SH12 between Whangarei and Wellsford, and a narrowing of the North Auckland Peninsula between Bream Bay and the upper branches of the Kaipara Harbour. It is most notable as the scene of a 1963 bus crash which killed 15 people in the Brynderwyn Range.

References

Populated places in the Northland Region